Andrée Brunet ( Joly, 16 September 1901 – 30 March 1993) was a French figure skater. Together with her husband Pierre Brunet she won Olympic medals in 1924, 1928 and 1932, as well as four world titles between 1926 and 1932 in pair skating. She also competed in singles, winning the national title in 1921–1930 and finishing fifth at the 1924 Winter Olympics.

Biography 
Andrée and Pierre are credited with creating mirror skating, new jumps, lifts, and spins. At their first Olympic games, the 1924 Games in Chamonix, they performed more skills than any pair previously had. However, the judges thought they performed too many tricks, and they were awarded only the bronze. Other skaters took note though, and the Joly/Brunet style quickly became common in the sport. Joly and Brunet continued to perform skills previously unseen in pair skating. Joly was also among the first female skaters to wear a black dress to match her partner's outfit, rather than the traditional white dress.

Andrée and Pierre soon became the leading skating pair. They were French national champions from 1924 until 1935, and won four World Championships, competing in alternate years (1926, 1928, 1930, and 1932). They were Olympic champions in 1928 and 1932. She was one of the oldest female figure skating Olympic champions. They refused to defend their title at the Garmisch-Partenkirchen 1936 Winter Olympics, however, in protest of Nazi Germany.

Joly and Brunet also competed in individual events—Joly placed 5th and 11th at the 1924 and 1928 Olympics, respectively. She was also the French women's champion from 1921 to 1931.

Pierre and Andrée were married in 1929 (and thereafter competed under the name "Brunet" instead of her maiden name "Joly"). In 1936 they turned professional and toured Europe and Canada. In 1940 they emigrated to the United States. They then became coaches, and trained future Olympic champions Carol Heiss and Scott Hamilton. They coached in New York, Illinois, and Michigan until retiring in 1979.

The couple had a son, Jean-Pierre, who became the U.S. pairs champion with Donna Jeanne Pospisil in 1945 and 1946.

The Brunets were inducted into the World Figure Skating Hall of Fame in 1976.

Results 
Ladies singles

Pairs (with Pierre Brunet)

References

External links 

 Pairs on Ice: Andrée Joly & Pierre Brunet
 

1901 births
1993 deaths
Figure skaters from Paris
French female pair skaters
French female single skaters
French figure skating coaches
Olympic figure skaters of France
Olympic bronze medalists for France
Olympic gold medalists for France
Figure skaters at the 1924 Winter Olympics
Figure skaters at the 1928 Winter Olympics
Figure skaters at the 1932 Winter Olympics
Olympic medalists in figure skating
World Figure Skating Championships medalists
European Figure Skating Championships medalists
Medalists at the 1924 Winter Olympics
Medalists at the 1928 Winter Olympics
Medalists at the 1932 Winter Olympics
French emigrants to the United States
European champions for France
20th-century French women